Quannan County is a county, under the jurisdiction of Ganzhou City, located in the far southwest of Jiangxi province, People's Republic of China.

Administrative divisions
In the present, Quannan County has 6 towns and 3 townships.
6 towns

3 townships
 Zhongzhai
 Shejing
 Longxia

Climate

References

Ganzhou
County-level divisions of Jiangxi